Coatsburg is a village in Adams County, Illinois, United States. The population was 150 at the 2020 census. It is part of the Quincy, IL–MO Micropolitan Statistical Area.

History
A post office called Coatsburgh was established in 1856, and the name was changed to Coatsburg in 1893. The village has the name of Robert Coats, a first settler.

Geography
Coatsburg is located at  (40.032493, -91.159561).

Demographics

As of the 2020 census there were 150 people, 80 households, and 42 families residing in the village. The racial makeup of the village was 92.00% White, 0.67% from other races, and 7.33% from two or more races. Hispanic or Latino of any race were 2.00% of the population.

There were 80 households, out of which 37.50% had children under the age of 18 living with them, 38.75% were married couples living together, 7.50% had a female householder with no husband present, and 47.50% were non-families. 26.25% of all households were made up of individuals, and 15.00% had someone living alone who was 65 years of age or older. The average household size was 2.79 and the average family size was 2.25.

The village's age distribution consisted of 17.8% under the age of 18, 5.0% from 18 to 24, 37.8% from 25 to 44, 21.1% from 45 to 64, and 18.3% who were 65 years of age or older. The median age was 35.6 years. For every 100 females, there were 130.8 males. For every 100 females age 18 and over, there were 124.2 males.

The median income for a household in the village was $55,714, and the median income for a family was $57,143. Males had a median income of $37,250 versus $23,750 for females. The per capita income for the village was $27,821. About 0.0% of families and 3.4% of the population were below the poverty line, including none of those under age 18 and 6.1% of those age 65 or over.

Notable people
 William S. Gray, educator and literacy advocate, co-author of the Dick and Jane readers
 A. Arnim White, United States Army officer

References

Villages in Adams County, Illinois
Quincy, Illinois micropolitan area
Villages in Illinois